The Saddle Creek Underpass is located in the Midtown area of Omaha, Nebraska. Designed to carry Saddle Creek Road under Dodge Street (US 6), the underpass was constructed in 1934 by the Works Progress Administration. It was included on the Bridges in Nebraska Multiple Property Submission on June 29, 1992.

About
The Nebraska Department of Roads Biennial Report of 1933-34 describes the construction of the underpass as featuring "a complete, modern street light system, and interlocking traffic control signal system, two pedestrian subways, and a grade separation of Dodge Street and Saddle Creek Boulevard."

The project was completed in 1934, and was designed to accommodate the westernmost addition to Omaha's boulevard system, which was originally called Saddle Creek Boulevard. Saddle Creek Road still utilizes the underpass today as it sits between the Morton Meadows and Dundee neighborhoods. As of 2004 the Underpass was the only property listed on the National Register in either neighborhood, although each one has submitted applications to be listed as a historic district.

See also
 Transportation in Omaha
 History of Omaha

References

Historic bridges in Omaha, Nebraska
National Register of Historic Places in Omaha, Nebraska
Road bridges on the National Register of Historic Places in Nebraska
Works Progress Administration in Nebraska
Concrete bridges in the United States
U.S. Route 6